Chystiakove, formerly Torez, is a city of regional significance in Donetsk Oblast, Ukraine. The city is a center of the regional coal industry and much of its economy relies on mining industries, despite a recent drop in the number of employed miners. The city has a population of 

Settled in 1778, the city was named Chystiakove in 1868. It was renamed Torez in 1964 for Maurice Thorez, a leader of the French Communist Party. In 2016, the Ukrainian parliament restored the historical name "Chystiakove" due to Ukrainian decommunization laws.

Pro-Russian separatists took control of Chystiakove in June 2014.

History
The region was settled in 1778 at the confluence of the Sevostyanivka and Orlova Rivers (which drain into the Mius River) by runaway serfs from southern Russia and Ukraine. By 1800 the settlement, with 225 residents, was known as the sloboda Oleksiivka after a son of landowner and founder S. Leonov. From 1840 it was named Oleksiieve-Leonove, and from 1868 Chystiakove.

By the 1860s the town, now known as Chystiakove for a merchant and owner of a local manor, was a coal-mining hub. In 1875, two mining companies were founded: Chystiakovs'ke (which operated two coal mines) and Oleksiivs'ke, which was renamed Nadiya in 1907. The mines produced 4.7 million pounds of coal in 1909, and 76.8 million pounds by 1916.

In 1924 the Chystiakove mining industry had 142 settlements, with a total of 44,679 residents. Eight years later the settlements became a town, and the town's ten coal-mining quarries were incorporated into the Chystyakovugol Industrial Trust a year after that.

During the 1940s, the town had three administrative districts:
 Chervona Zirka (Red Star)
 Pivdenna Grupa (Southern Group)
 Chystiakove Station (Railway)

During World War II, Chystiakove was occupied by the German Army from October 31, 1941 to September 2, 1943. In 1964 Chystiakove was renamed Torez in honor of Maurice Thorez, the longtime leader of the French Communist Party who was a coal miner.

In 2012, the city's population was 81,761, down from a 1970 peak of about 120,000.

In mid-April 2014 pro-Russian separatists captured several towns in Donetsk Oblast, including Chystiakove in June 2014. On 23 May 2014, a pro-Ukrainian militia endorsed by Oleh Lyashko killed a pro-Russian separatist and left another badly wounded amidst the separatists' takeover of the city hall.

On 17 July, Malaysia Airlines Flight 17, en route to Kuala Lumpur from Amsterdam, was hit by a Russian Buk surface-to-air missile launched from separatist-controlled territory. The plane crashed near Chystiakove and all 298 people aboard were killed.

Demographics 
As of the 2001 Ukrainian census:

Ethnicity
 Ukrainians: 50.8%
 Russians: 45.1%
 Belarusians: 1.3%
 Tatars: 1.3%
 Armenians: 0.2%
 Greeks: 0.1%

Native language
 Russian: 81.83%
 Ukrainian: 17.03%
 Belarusian: 0.18%
 Armenian: 0.11%
 Moldovan: 0.03%
 Bulgarian: 0.01%
 Greek: 0.01%

Transportation

Chystiakove's transport system consists of thirty-one routes served by buses and taxis and links to the cities of Snizhne and Shakhtarsk. The Luhansk-Donetsk Highway runs for nine kilometers through the center of the city. The bus station (vulytsia Popovycha) provides service to Donetsk, Kharkiv and other cities in eastern Ukraine. The city has three major railway stations: Torez (vulytsia Vokzalna), Rozsypne and Pelahiyivka. Two stations serve electric commuter trains: Dronove in Pelahiyivka and Voskresenska in central Chystiakove.

Economy

Chystiakove's major company is the state-owned Torez Anthracite, which specializes in coal mining. The company controls a number of mines and production facilities, including the Progress Mine, the Lutugin and Volhynian Mine Administrations and the Chystiakove factory. Other employers include the Chystiakove electrical and alloy factories, the Vuhleresurs Company's Terra mine, the State Penal Department and the Chystiakove food-testing factory.

Neighborhoods

Chystiakove's center includes Pionerska, Nikolaeva, Engels, Syzrantsev and 50 Years of the USSR Streets, Gagarin Avenue and Boulevard Illich. Neighborhoods are numbered one through four (Engels Street), 30th Anniversary of Victory, G and Red Star (Chervona Zirka).

Central Village ( in southeastern Chystiakove was one of the first settlements in Chystiakove, which became a city in 1932. It has an acting school and two kindergartens.

Shanghai, a small residential area also in southeastern Chystiakove, was built in 1946 by Hungarian prisoners of war and consists of seven-story apartment buildings. In addition to Chystiakove, its city council governs two towns: Pelahiyivka and Rozsypne.

Gallery

References

External links

Unofficial city website 

Cities in Donetsk Oblast
Don Host Oblast
Cities of regional significance in Ukraine
Populated places established in the Russian Empire
City name changes in Ukraine
Mining cities and regions in Ukraine
Horlivka Raion
Malaysia Airlines Flight 17